The Ivory Coast national football team (French: Équipe de football de Côte d'Ivoire, recognized as the Côte d'Ivoire by FIFA) represents Ivory Coast in men's international football. Nicknamed the Elephants, the team is managed by the Ivorian Football Federation (FIF). Until 2005, their greatest accomplishment was winning the 1992 African Cup of Nations against Ghana on penalties at the Stade Léopold Sédar Senghor in Dakar, Senegal. Their second success came in 2015, again defeating Ghana on penalties in Bata, Equatorial Guinea. The team represents both FIFA and Confederation of African Football (CAF).

The team had their best run between 2006 and 2014 when they qualified for three consecutive FIFA World Cups.

History

1960s
The team played its first international match against Dahomey, now known as Benin, which they won 32 on 13 April 1960 in Madagascar.

The team took a large 110 victory against the Central African Republic. In 1961 the team made their first appearance in the Africa Cup of Nations. After gaining independence from France, the team finished third in the 1963 and 1965 tournaments.

1970s
Ivory Coast's performances in the 1970s were mixed. In the 1970 African Cup of Nations, the team finished top of their group, but lost to Ghana - the powerhouses of African football at the time - in the semi-finals, and went on to finish 4th after losing the third-place play-off to the United Arab Republic (now Egypt). They failed to qualify for the 1972 edition, losing 4–3 to Congo-Brazzaville in the final qualifying round. They qualified in 1974 but finished bottom of their group with only a single point, then failed to qualify in 1976, again losing to Congo-Brazzaville (now simply known as the Congo) in the first round.

The team initially qualified for 1978, beating Mali 2–1 on aggregate, but were disqualified for fielding an ineligible player in the second leg. Mali were also disqualified, due to police and stadium security assaulting the match officials during the first leg, and so Upper Volta, who Ivory Coast had beaten in the first qualifying round, inherited their place.

1980s
In 1984, the team hosted the African Cup of Nations for the first time, but failed to get out of their group. In 1986, they narrowly qualified from their group on goals scored, and went on to finish third once more, beating Morocco 3–2 in the third-place play-off.

1990s
At the 1992 Africa Cup of Nations, Ivory Coast beat Algeria 30 and drew 00 with Congo to finish top of their group. An extra-time victory over Zambia and a penalty shoot-out win over Cameroon took them to the final for the first time, where they faced Ghana. The match again went to a penalty shoot-out, which became (at the time) the highest-scoring in international football; Ivory Coast eventually triumphed 11–10 to win the title for the first time. They were unable to defend their title in water, losing to Nigeria in the semi-finals.

The Ivory Coast team is notable for having participated in (and won) the two highest-scoring penalty shoot-outs in international football competition — the 24-shot shoot-out in the final of the 1992 African Cup of Nations when Ghana was defeated 11–10, and the 24-shot shoot-out in the quarter-final of the 2006 African Cup of Nations, when Cameroon was defeated 12–11. In 2015, Ivory Coast once again defeated Ghana in the final of an 2015 African Cup of Nations with a 22-shot shoot-out, winning 9–8.

2000s and World Cup debut
In October 2005, Ivory Coast secured qualification for the 2006 FIFA World Cup, which was to be their first-ever appearance at the tournament. Having been drawn into a "Group of Death" that also featured Cameroon and Egypt, Ivory Coast went into the final match second behind Cameroon, but qualified after beating Sudan 3-1 while Cameroon could only draw with Egypt.

In the tournament itself, Ivory Coast were drawn into another Group of Death, against Argentina, Holland, and Serbia and Montenegro. They lost 2–1 to Argentina - with Didier Drogba scoring the team's first-ever World Cup goal in the 82nd minute - and then 2–1 to the Netherlands, meaning they had already been eliminated by the time they played Serbia and Montenegro. Despite going 2-0 down after just 20 minutes, Ivory Coast came back to win 3–2, with Bonaventure Kalou scoring an 86th-minute penalty to give Ivory Coast their first-ever World Cup victory.

After Uli Stielike left before the 2008 African Cup of Nations, due to his son's health, co-trainer Gerard Gili took his position. To compensate of the lack of another co-coach, Didier Drogba acted as a player-coach. This was only the second time that a player had also acted as a coach at the tournament, after George Weah was both player and coach for Liberia during the 2002 tournament.

2010s

Ivory Coast qualified for the 2010 FIFA World Cup in South Africa, and were again drawn in a "Group of Death", against five-time champions Brazil, Portugal, and North Korea. Having managed a 0–0 draw against Portugal, a 3–1 defeat to Brazil meant that in order to qualify from their group, they would have to beat North Korea, Brazil needed to beat Portugal, and (thanks to Portugal's 7–0 win over North Korea) there needed to be a substantial swing in goal difference. Ivory Coast won 3–0, but Portugal held Brazil to a 0–0 draw and Ivory Coast were once again eliminated in the group stages.

2014

The team made a third appearance in the 2014 FIFA World Cup in Brazil, where they were drawn in Group C against Colombia, Greece, and Japan. After coming from behind to beat Japan 2–1, Ivory Coast then lost 2–1 to Colombia, leaving their qualification in the balance. In their final match against Greece, the score was 1-1 going into stoppage time, and with Japan losing 4–1 to Colombia, Ivory Coast looked set to qualify. However, in the 93rd minute, Giovanni Sio gave away a penalty which Georgios Samaras converted, giving Greece both the victory and the place in the last 16; Ivory Coast, meanwhile, went out in the group stage for the third tournament in a row.

The team's streak of World Cup qualifications came to an end at the 2018 tournament. Needing a win in their final match against Morocco, they instead lost 2–0, meaning Morocco qualified instead.

Home stadium
From 1964 to 2020, Stade Félix Houphouët-Boigny, a 50,000-seater stadium in Abidjan was the main venue used to host home matches. In 2020, the 60,000-seat Stade National, also in Abidjan, was opened ahead of the 2023 Africa Cup Of Nations.

Supporters
Supporters of the Elephants are known to be among the most colorful in Africa. At Ivory Coast matches, the Elephants supporter sections typically include a percussion band that mimics the sounds of an elephant traveling through a forest.

Results and fixtures
The following is a list of match results in the last twelve months, as well as any future matches that have been scheduled.

2022

2023

Coaching staff

Coaching history 

   (1960)
  Alphonse Bissouma Tapé (1965)
   (1967–68)
  Peter Schnittger (1968–70)
   (1970–72)
  Santa Rosa (1972–74)
   (1976–80)
  Otto Pfister (1982–85)
   (1984)
  Pancho Gonzales (1986)
  Yeo Martial (1987–88)
  Kaé Oulaï (1989)
  Radivoje Ognjanović (1989–92)
  Yeo Martial (1992)
  Philippe Troussier (1993)
  Henryk Kasperczak (1993–94)
  Pierre Pleimelding (1994–96)
  Robert Nouzaret (1996–98)
  Patrick Parizon (1999–00)
  Gbonke Tia (2000–01)
   (2001)
  Robert Nouzaret (2002–04)
  Henri Michel (2004–07)
  Uli Stielike (2007–08)
  Gérard Gili (2008)
  Vahid Halilhodžić (2008–10)
   (2010)
  Sven-Göran Eriksson (2010)
  François Zahoui (2010–12)
  Sabri Lamouchi (2012–14)
  Hervé Renard (2014–15)
  Michel Dussuyer (2015–17)
  Marc Wilmots (2017)
  Ibrahim Kamara (2018–20)
  Patrice Beaumelle (2020–2022)
  Jean-Louis Gasset (2022–present)

Players

Current squad
The following players were selected for the 2023 Africa Cup of Nations qualification matches against Comoros on 24 and 28 March 2023.

Caps and goals updated as of 19 November 2022, after the match against Burkina Faso.

Recent call-ups
The following players have also been called up to the squad within the last 12 months and are still eligible to represent.

DEC Player refused to join the team after the call-up.
INJ Player withdrew from the squad due to an injury.
PRE Preliminary Squad.
SUS Suspended from the national team.

Records

Players in bold are still active with Ivory Coast.

Most capped players

Top goalscorers

Competitive record

FIFA World Cup

Africa Cup of Nations
 

*Denotes draws include knockout matches decided via penalty shoot-out.
**Gold background colour indicates that the tournament was won.***Red border color indicates tournament was held on home soil.''

African Nations Championship

FIFA Confederations Cup

African Games

CECAFA Cup

Honours
 Africa Cup of Nations
  Champions: 1992, 2015
  Runner-up: 2006, 2012
 FIFA Confederations Cup:
 Fourth-place: 1992

See also
Ivory Coast national under-20 football team
Ivory Coast at the Africa Cup of Nations

References

External links

Official website
Ivory Coast at FIFA.com
Ivory Coast at the World Cups
Ivory Coast Teams at World Cups
Ivory Coast: Head-to-Head Records at World Cups
Ivory Coast Players' Clubs

 
African national association football teams
I